Allauddinum Albhutha Vilakkum is a 1979 Indian fantasy film directed by I. V. Sasi, based on Aladdin's story from One Thousand and One Nights. The film stars Kamal Haasan, Rajinikanth, Jayabharathi, Sripriya, Gemini Ganesan, Savitri and S. A. Ashokan. It was simultaneously filmed in Malayalam and Tamil languages, the latter as Allaudinaum Arputha Vilakkum which was released on 8 June 1979, two months after the Malayalam version which came on 14 April 1979.

Plot 

Kamaruddin, the commander of the armed forces of Baghdad, has a desire for princess Roshni, the heiress to the kingdom, as her husband will rule the land after the Caliph's death. Roshni, however, loves street urchin Alavuddin, and he reciprocates. Alavuddin's childhood friend Jameela loves him, but it is a one-sided affair. Alavuddin and Kamaruddin fight a duel for winning over Roshni. Alavuddin triumphs, but his joy is short-lived as the courtier Mir Qasim, who wants Roshni for himself, kidnaps her and spirits her away. Alavuddin and Kamaruddin join forces and with help from a genie, rescue Roshni. On the way back, Kamaruddin is trapped in quicksand, but is rescued by Jameela. They unite.

Cast 

Additionally, Bollywood actresses Helen, Bindu and Jayshree T. portray cabaret dancers.

Production 
Allauddinum Albhutha Vilakkum, directed by I. V. Sasi, was based on the story of Aladdin from One Thousand and One Nights, and had Kamal Haasan playing the title character, named Alavuddin here. Rajinikanth was cast as Kamaruddin, a character not present in the original story but created for the film. It was his first film in the Malayalam language and the fantasy genre. The film was simultaneously shot in Tamil as Allaudinaum Arputha Vilakkum, marking Sasi's directorial debut in Tamil cinema. This version was the second Tamil adaptation of the story of Aladdin, after a 1957 film with the same name. Ramachandra Babu worked as cinematographer, and the film was made in CinemaScope. According to him, Rajinikanth would often turn violent on the sets: "[He] was always under the influence of liquor and could turn violent any moment. Even Kamal was wary of doing fight sequences with [him]".

Soundtrack 
The soundtrack of both versions was composed by G. Devarajan. The lyrics for the Malayalam version were written by Yusufali Kechery, while the lyrics for the Tamil version were written by Vaali and Kannadasan.

Release and reception
Allauddinum Albhutha Vilakkum was released on 14 April 1979, and Allaudinaum Arputha Vilakkum on 8 June 1979. The film performed well at the box office for the first two weeks, but slumped in the third. Reviewing the Tamil version for Kalki, Kausikan panned the film for completely ruining the story of Aladdin and also panned the poor casting choices and clownish portrayal of the genie. He also added Gemini Ganesan was underutilised and felt Rajinikanth's character was added just for fights while calling the story and dialogues as poor.

References

Bibliography

External links 
 

1970s fantasy films
1970s Malayalam-language films
1970s multilingual films
1970s Tamil-language films
Films based on Aladdin
Films directed by I. V. Sasi
Genies in film
Indian fantasy films
Indian multilingual films